Dichondra carolinensis, commonly known as Carolina ponysfoot, is a small herbaceous plant native to Bermuda and the south-eastern United States.

References 

Convolvulaceae
Groundcovers